Basten Caerts (born 27 October 1997) is a Belgian swimmer. He competed in the men's 200 metre breaststroke event at the 2016 Summer Olympics.

References

External links
 

1997 births
Living people
Place of birth missing (living people)
Belgian male breaststroke swimmers
Olympic swimmers of Belgium
Swimmers at the 2016 Summer Olympics
Swimmers at the 2014 Summer Youth Olympics
Swimmers at the 2015 European Games
European Games competitors for Belgium